Jean Marie "Jeff" Donnell (July 10, 1921 – April 11, 1988) was an American film and television actress.

Early years 
Donnell was born in South Windham, Maine, to Harold and Mildred Donnell, when her father was superintendent at a boys' reformatory in that town. As a child, she adopted the nickname "Jeff" after the character in her favorite comic strip, Mutt and Jeff.  To avoid gender confusion, she was sometimes billed as "(Miss) Jeff Donnell."

Donnell graduated from Towson High School, Towson, Maryland, in 1938 and attended the Leland Powers School of Drama in Boston, Massachusetts. Later, she studied at the Yale School of Drama.

Career
Donnell was signed to a contract by Columbia Pictures while she was active with the Farragut Playhouse in New Hampshire, and she made her film debut in My Sister Eileen (1942).

She became a fixture at Columbia, working steadily in comedies, mysteries, westerns, and musicals for five years, and then off and on at the studio from 1950 to 1972. During the 1940s she was typically the house tomboy, a plain-speaking sidekick for the glamorous ingenue, and developed a flair for comedy. Columbia did give Donnell the glamour treatment later (in the 1946 Boston Blackie mystery The Phantom Thief, in which she played a troubled heiress), but she never shook the sidekick image. When her Columbia contract ran out, she freelanced at other studios, mostly in low-budget action pictures. She returned to Columbia in 1950. She had met Lucille Ball on the set of the 1948 RKO Radio Pictures production Easy Living; Ball remembered Donnell and recruited her to play her sidekick in The Fuller Brush Girl (1950).

Donnell continued to play character roles in motion pictures and television; for three seasons, she portrayed George Gobel's wife, Alice, in The George Gobel Show (1954–1957) on NBC-TV. Many of her assignments were for Columbia (notably as Gidget's mother Dorothy Lawrence in Gidget Goes Hawaiian and Gidget Goes to Rome) and Columbia's TV subsidiary Screen Gems (she played Hannah Marshall in the Gidget television series,  and portrayed Mrs. Bennett in the TV series Julia). In 1966 she made five appearances on Dr. Kildare as Evelyn Driscoll, and she played Ethel on the Matt Helm TV series.

Her last Columbia feature was the women's lib-themed comedy Stand Up and Be Counted (1972). Her final recurring role was as Stella Fields, the Quartermaines' housekeeper, in the popular soap opera General Hospital, from 1979 to 1988.

Her other notable appearances in movies and television include:

My Sister Eileen (1942) - Helen Loomis
The Boogie Man Will Get You (1942) - Winnie Slade
A Night to Remember (1942) - Anne Stafford Carstairs
What's Buzzin', Cousin? (1943) - Billie (uncredited)
Doughboys in Ireland (1943) - Molly Callahan
There's Something About a Soldier (1943) - Jean Burton
Nine Girls (1944) - 'Butch' Hendricks
Once Upon a Time (1944) - Girl from Brooklyn (uncredited)
Stars on Parade (1944) - Mary Brooks
She's a Soldier Too (1944) - Mary Fleming (uncredited)
Sensations of 1945 (1944) - Young Girl (uncredited)
Mr. Winkle Goes to War (1944) - USO Hostess (uncredited)
Three Is a Family (1944) - Hazel Whittaker
Dancing in Manhattan (1944) - Julie Connors
Carolina Blues (1944) - Charlotte Barton
Eadie Was a Lady (1945) - Pamela 'Pepper' Parker
The Power of the Whistler (1945) - Francie
A Thousand and One Nights (1945) - Harem Girl (uncredited)
Over 21 (1945) - Jan Lupton
Song of the Prairie (1945) - Penelope 'Penny' Stevens
Tars and Spars (1946) - Penny McDougal
Throw a Saddle on a Star (1946) - Judy Lane
Night Editor (1946) - Martha Cochrane
The Phantom Thief (1946) - Anne Parks Duncan
That Texas Jamboree (1946) - Jean Warren
The Unknown (1946, One of the "I Love A Mystery" movies) - Nina Arnold
Cowboy Blues (1946) - Susan Nelson
Singing on the Trail (1946) - Cindy Brown
It's Great to Be Young (1946) - Georgia Johnson
Mr. District Attorney (1947) - Miss Miller
Roughshod (1949) - Elaine Wyatt
Stagecoach Kid (1949) - Jessie Arnold
Outcasts of the Trail (1949) - Vinnie White
Post Office Investigator (1949) - April Shaughnessy
Easy Living (1949) - Penny McCarr
In a Lonely Place (1950) - Sylvia Nicolai
Hoedown (1950) - Vera Wright
Big Timber (1950) - Sally
The Fuller Brush Girl (1950) - Jane Bixby
Redwood Forest Trail (1950) - Julie Westcott
Walk Softly, Stranger (1950) - Gwen
Three Guys Named Mike (1951) - Alice Raymend
The First Time (1952) - Donna Gilbert
Thief of Damascus (1952) - Sheherazade
Skirts Ahoy! (1952) - Lt. Giff
Because You're Mine (1952) - Patty Ware
The Blue Gardenia (1953) - Sally Ellis
So This Is Love (1953) - Henrietta Van Dyke
Flight Nurse (1953) - Lt. Ann Phillips
Massacre Canyon (1954) - Cora
Magnificent Roughnecks (1956) - Julie
Mr. Adams and Eve (1957, Episode: "You Can't Go Home Again") - Adele
The Guns of Fort Petticoat (1957) - Mary Wheller
Destination 60,000 (1957) - Ruth Buckley
Sweet Smell of Success (1957) - Sally
My Man Godfrey (1957) - Molly
Gidget Goes Hawaiian (1961) - Dorothy Lawrence
Force of Impulse (1961) - Louise Reese
Perry Mason (1962-1964, TV Series) - Rose Carol
The Iron Maiden (1963; released in the U.S. as Swinging Maiden) - Miriam Fisher
Gidget Goes to Rome (1963) - Mrs. Lawrence
The Addams Family (1966, TV Series) - Eleanor Digby
The Comic (1969) - Nurse
Tora! Tora! Tora! (1970) - Cornelia Fort, a flying instructor
The Jimmy Stewart Show (1971, TV Series) - Agatha Dwiggins
Stand Up and Be Counted (1972) - Ruth
Adam-12 (1973, TV Series) - Mrs James Nelson
Barnaby Jones (1973, Episode: "Sunday: Doomsday") - Janet Gossett
The Amazing Spider-Man (1977, TV Series) - Aunt May Parker
The Bob Newhart Show (1978, TV Series) - Clara Hackler ("The Little Woman")
General Hospital (1979–1988, in the TV soap opera) - Stella Fields (final appearance)

Personal life 
Donnell's first marriage was in 1940 to William "Bill" Anderson, who was her teacher at the Leland Powers Dramatic School. She had her only children with him, Michael Phineas (b. 1942) and Sarah Jane (b. 1948), before their divorce in 1953.

Death
Donnell died of a heart attack on April 11, 1988, aged 66. Her sudden absence from General Hospital was explained away by the writers as her character having won the lottery and quit her job.

Notes

References

External links
 
 Photos of Jeff Donnell 1940s various films by Ned Scott

1921 births
1988 deaths
20th-century American actresses
Actresses from Maine
American film actresses
American soap opera actresses
American television actresses
People from Windham, Maine
RKO Pictures contract players
Towson High School alumni
Yale School of Drama alumni